Shadrach Odhiambo (born 20 October 1954) is an Ugandan-born Swedish boxer. He competed at the 1980 Summer Olympics and the 1984 Summer Olympics. At the 1980 Summer Olympics, he defeated Bogdan Gajda of Poland, before losing to Tony Willis of Great Britain.

References

External links
 

1954 births
Living people
Swedish male boxers
Olympic boxers of Sweden
Boxers at the 1980 Summer Olympics
Boxers at the 1984 Summer Olympics
People from Jinja District
Ugandan male boxers
Commonwealth Games medallists in boxing
Commonwealth Games silver medallists for Uganda
Boxers at the 1974 British Commonwealth Games
AIBA World Boxing Championships medalists
Light-welterweight boxers
Medallists at the 1974 British Commonwealth Games